William Bebb Richardson (29 February 1912, Pasadena, California – 25 January 2006, Lindsay, California) was an American mammalogist.

Richardson received his bachelor's degree in 1935 from the University of California, Berkeley. He participated in the Archbold 1938–1939 expedition to New Guinea.

Associated eponyms for William Bebb Richardson
Microhydromys richardsoni – Northern groove-toothed shrew mouse (or Richardson's shrew mouse)
Rattus richardsoni – Glacier rat (or Richardson's mountain rat)

References

1912 births
2006 deaths
American mammalogists
University of California, Berkeley alumni
People from Pasadena, California
People from Lindsay, California
20th-century American zoologists